The Netherlands women's national under-20 volleyball team represents Netherlands in international women's volleyball competitions and friendly matches under the age 20 and it is ruled by the Dutch Volleyball Association That is an affiliate of International Volleyball Federation FIVB and also a part of European Volleyball Confederation CEV.

Results

FIVB U20 World Championship
 Champions   Runners up   Third place   Fourth place

Europe U19 Championship
 Champions   Runners up   Third place   Fourth place

Team

Current squad
The following is the Dutch roster in the 2016 European U19 Championship.

Head coach:  Julien Van De Vyver

References

External links
Official website 

National women's under-20 volleyball teams
Volleyball
Volleyball in the Netherlands